Multimodal may refer to:

 Multimodal distribution, a statistical distribution of values with multiple peaks
 Multimodal interaction, a form of human-machine interaction using multiple modes of input/output
 Multimodal therapy, an approach to psychotherapy
 Multimodal learning, machine learning methods using multiple input modalities
 Multimodal transport, a journey involving the use of multiple modes of transport, for example rail and bus
 Multimodality, the use of several modes (media) in a single artifact
 Multimodal logic modal logic that has more than one primitive modal operator
 Evolutionary multimodal optimization, finding all or most of the multiple (at least locally optimal) solutions of a problem

See also